Elections to Burnley Borough Council in Lancashire, England were held on 22 May 2014, as part of the wider 2014 UK local elections and the United Kingdom component of the 2014 European Parliament election.

Due to the 'in thirds' format of elections in Burnley, these elections are for those electoral district wards fought in the 2010 Burnley Borough Council election, with changes in vote share compared directly with that year. These seats were contested again in 2018.

The Labour Party retained control of the Council. After the election Julie Cooper stood-down from the role of council leader to focus on campaigning in the 2015 General Election, being replaced by Mark Townsend.

State of the Parties
After the election, the composition of the council was
Labour 28
Liberal Democrats 12
Conservative 5

Results

Ward results

References

2014 English local elections
2014
2010s in Lancashire